Philippe "Philip" Szanyiel (born 23 December 1960) is a French former professional basketball player and coach. He was inducted into the French Basketball Hall of Fame, as a player, in 2011.

Professional career
Szanyiel was named to the FIBA European Selection team in 1991.
With ASVEL, Szanyiel made it to the 1982–83 season's finals of the secondary level European-wide club competition, the FIBA European Cup Winners' Cup (FIBA Saporta Cup). Szanyiel was the French League's French Player's MVP in 1983.

National team career
With the senior French national team, Szanyiel competed at the following tournaments: the 1980 FIBA European Olympic Qualifying Tournament, the 1981 EuroBasket, the 1983 EuroBasket, the 1984 Summer Olympics, the 1985 EuroBasket, the 1988 FIBA European Olympic Qualifying Tournament, the 1991 EuroBasket, and the 1992 FIBA European Olympic Qualifying Tournament. 

With France's senior national team, he scored a total of 2,363 points, in 192 games played.

References

External links
FIBA Profile
FIBA Europe Profile
ProBallers.com Profile

1960 births
Living people
AS Monaco Basket players
ASVEL Basket players
Basketball players at the 1984 Summer Olympics
ES Avignon Basket players
FC Mulhouse Basket coaches
FC Mulhouse Basket players
French men's basketball players
Olympic basketball players of France
People from Manosque
Power forwards (basketball)
Sportspeople from Alpes-de-Haute-Provence